Byrd Presbyterian Church is a historic Presbyterian church located at Goochland in western Goochland County, Virginia on Dogtown Road.  The original building dates from 1838 and is still in active use today. It is a two-story, rectangular brick structure with a slate gable roof. The interior of the church measures 28 feet by 40 feet.  Also on the property is a contributing church cemetery with graves dating
back to at least the 1850s.

The original congregation began in 1748, and erected a dedicated building on Byrd Creek in 1759. Notable theologian Samuel Davies was one of the founding members.

It was listed on the National Register of Historic Places in 2000.

References

External links
 Byrd Presbyterian Church
 Byrd Presbyterian Church Historical Highway Marker

Churches on the National Register of Historic Places in Virginia
Churches completed in 1838
Buildings and structures in Goochland County, Virginia
Presbyterian churches in Virginia
National Register of Historic Places in Goochland County, Virginia